Naoise is an Irish first name, also rendered as Neesy, Nessie, or Naisi used for both males and females. It may refer to :

Naoise, figure in the Ulster Cycle of Irish myth, lover of Deidre
Naoise EP, musical recording by Dosh

People with the name
Naoise O'Haughan (1691-1721), highwayman
Naoise Ó Muirí (1972-), Fine Gael politician
Naoisé O'Reilly, psychologist
Naisi Chen, Chinese-New Zealander politician
Yang Naisi (1927–2019), Chinese linguist and research professor

See also
Nessie (disambiguation)